The second Robertson ministry was the eleventh ministry of the Colony of New South Wales, and was led by John Robertson. It was the second of five occasions that Robertson was Leader of the Government. Robertson was elected in the first free elections for the New South Wales Legislative Assembly held in March 1856.

The title of Premier was widely used to refer to the Leader of Government, but not enshrined in formal use until 1920.

There was no party system in New South Wales politics until 1887. Under the constitution, ministers were required to resign to recontest their seats in a by-election when appointed. Such ministerial by-elections were usually uncontested and on this occasion a poll was required at Wellington (Saul Samuel) however he was comfortably re-elected with 69% of the vote. The other ministers were all re-elected unopposed.

This ministry covers the period from 27 October 1868 until 12 January 1870, when Robertson resigned his commission after he failed to gain support of the Assembly. Robertson stood aside for his colleague, Charles Cowper.

Composition of ministry

 
Ministers are members of the Legislative Assembly unless otherwise noted.

See also

Self-government in New South Wales
Members of the New South Wales Legislative Assembly, 1864–1869
First Robertson ministry (1860–1861)
Third Robertson ministry (1875–1877)
Fourth Robertson ministry (1877)
Fifth Robertson ministry (1885–1886)

References

 

New South Wales ministries
1868 establishments in Australia
1870 disestablishments in Australia